Vegetation classification is the process of classifying and mapping the vegetation over an area of the earth's surface. Vegetation classification is often performed by state based agencies as part of land use, resource and environmental management. Many different methods of vegetation classification have been used. In general, there has been a shift from structural classification used by forestry for the mapping of timber resources, to floristic community mapping for biodiversity management. Whereas older forestry-based schemes considered factors such as height, species and density of the woody canopy, floristic community mapping shifts the emphasis onto ecological factors such as climate, soil type and floristic associations. Classification mapping is usually now done using geographic information systems (GIS) software.

Classification schemes 
Following, some important classification schemes.

Köppen (1884)

Although this scheme is in fact of a climate classification, it has a deep relationship with vegetation studies:
 Class A
 Tropical rainforest (Af)
 Tropical monsoon (Am)
 Tropical savanna (Aw, As)
 Class B
 Desert (BWh, BWk)
 Semi-arid (BSh, BSk)
 Class C
 Humid subtropical (Cfa, Cwa)
 Oceanic (Cfb, Cwb, Cfc, Cwc)
 Mediterranean (Csa, Csb, Csc)
 Class D
 Humid continental (Dfa, Dwa, Dfb, Dwb, Dsa, Dsb)
 Subarctic (Dfc, Dwc, Dfd, Dwd, Dsc, Dsd)
 Class E
 Tundra (ET)
 Ice cap (EF)
 Alpine (ET, EF)

Wagner & von Sydow (1888)
Wagner & von Sydow (1888) scheme: Vegetationsgürtel (vegetation belts):
 Tundren (tundra)
 Hochgebirgsflora (mountain flora)
 Vegetationsarme Gebiete (Wüsten) (vegetation poor areas [deserts])
 der gemässigten zone (the temperate zone)
 Grasland (prairie)
 Vorherrschend Nadelwald (mainly coniferous forest)
 Wald (Laub und Nadelwald) und Kulturland (forest [deciduous and coniferous forest] and cultivated land)
 in tropischen und subtropischen Gebieten (in tropical and subtropical areas)
 Grasland (prairie)
 Wald und Kulturland (forest and cultivated land)
 Urwald (jungle)

Warming (1895, 1909)
Warming (1895, 1909) oecological classes:
 A. The soil (in the widest sense) is very wet, and the abundant water is available to the plant (at least in Class 1), the formations are therefore more or less hydrophilous: 
 Class 1. Hydrophytes (of formations in water). 
 Class 2. Helophytes (of formations in marsh). 
 B. The soil is physiologically dry, i. e. contains water which is available to the plant only to a slight extent; the formations are therefore essentially composed of xerophilous species: 
 Class 3. Oxylophytes (of formations on sour (acid) soil).
 Class 4. Psychrophytes (of formations on cold soil).
 Class 5. Halophytes (of formations on saline soil).
 C. The soil is physically dry, and its slight power of retaining water determines the vegetation, the climate being of secondary import; the formations are therefore likewise xerophilous: 
 Class 6. Lithophytes (of formations on rocks).
 Class 7. Psammophytes (of formations on sand and gravel).
 Class 8. Chersophytes (of formations on waste land).
 D. The climate is very dry and decides the character of the vegetation; the properties of the soil are dominated by climate; the formations are also xerophilous:
 Class 9. Eremophytes (of formations on desert and steppe).
 Class 10. Psilophytes (of formations on savannah).
 Class 11. Sclerophyllous formations (bush and forest).
 E. The soil is physically or physically dry: 
 Class 12. Coniferous formations (forest).
 F. Soil and climate favour the development of mesophilous formations:
 Class 13. Mesophytes.

Warming's types of formations:
 1. Microphyte-formation 
 2. Moss-formation 
 3. Herb-formation 
 4. Dwarf-shrub formations and undershrub-formations
 5. Bush-wood or shrub-wood 
 6. Forest 
 High forest 
 Underwood 
 Forest-floor vegetation
 Other
 Simple formations 
 Compound formations 
 Mixed formations 
 Secondary formations 
 Sub-formations

Schimper (1898, 1903)
Schimper (1898, 1903) climatic chief formation types:
 Woodland, forest, bushwood, shrubwood 
 Grassland, meadow (hygrophilous or tropophilous), steppe (xerophilous), savannah (xerophilous grassland containing isolated trees)
 Desert (dry or cold)

Schimper formation types across the zones and regions
 Tropical zone formations
 Climatic formations
 Tropical districts constantly moist
 Rain-forest
 Tropical districts with pronounced dry seasons
 Woodland formations (monsoon-forest, savannah-forest, thorn-forest)
 Grassland formations
 Tropical deserts
 Edaphic formations
 In Tropical Inland Country
 In Tropical Sea-shore
 Temperate zone formations
 Climatic formations
 Warm temperate belts
 Subtropical districts
 Constantly moist districts (without a dry season)
 Moist summer districts
 Moist winter districts
 Cold temperate belts
 Temperate deserts
 Edaphic formations
 Littoral Formations
 Heath
 Moors
 Arctic zone formations
 Tundra, moss-tundra, lichen-tundra, moors, oases
 Mountain climate formations (basal region, montane region, alpine region)
 In the tropics
 In the temperate zones
 Aquatic vegetation
 Marine vegetation
 Freshwater vegetation

Schimper & Faber (1935)
Formation-types:
 1. Tropical rainforest
 2. Subtropical rainforest
 3. Monsoon forest
 4. Temperate rainforest
 5. Summer-green deciduous forest 
 6. Needle-leaf forest
 7. Evergreen hardwood forest
 8. Savanna woodland
 9. Thorn forest and scrub
 10. Savanna
 11. Steppe and semidesert
 12. Heath
 13. Dry desert
 14. Tundra and cold woodland
 15. Cold desert

Ellenberg & Mueller-Dombois (1967)
Ellenberg and Mueller-Dombois (1967) scheme:
 Formation-class I. Closed forests
 Formation-class II. Woodlands
 Formation-class III. Fourrés (shrublands or thickets)
 Formation-class IV. Dwarf-scrub and related communities
 Formation-class V. Terrestrial herbaceous communities
 Formation-class VI. Deserts and other scarcely vegetated areas
 Formation-class VII. Aquatic plant formations

Oliveira-Filho (2009, 2015) 
A vegetation classification with six main criteria ("hierarchical attributes", with exemplified categories applicable mainly to Neotropical region):
 A. Basic vegetation physiognomies
 1. Forest physiognomies
 2. Shrubland physiognomies
 3. Savanna physiognomies
 4. Grassland physiognomies
 5. Man-made physiognomies
 B. Climatic regime
 Maritime
 Semi-arid
 Seasonal
 Rain
 Cloud
 C. Leaf flush regime
 Evergreen 
 Semideciduous 
 Deciduous 
 Alternate
 Ephemeral
 D. Thermal realm
 Tropical
 Subtropical, etc.
 E. Elevation range
 Coastal
 Lower plains
 Upper plains
 Lower highlands 
 Upper highlands
 Montane
 F. Substrate
 Shallow soils
 Deep soils
 Soily
 Sandy
 Gravelly
 Rocky
 Dystrophic
 Mesotrophic
 Eutrophic
 Ridge 
 Slope
 Thalweg
 Riverine
 Floodplain
 Marshy
 Swampy

Other
Other important schemes: Grisebach (1872), Tansley and Chipp (1926), Rübel (1930), Burtt Davy (1938), Beard (1944, 1955), André Aubréville (1956, 1957), Trochain (1955, 1957), Dansereau (1958), Küchler (1967),  Webb and  Tracey (1975).

In the sixties, A. W. Kuchler coordinated an extensive review of vegetation maps from all the continents, compiling the terminology used for the types of vegetation.

See also 
 Biogeography
 Ecological classification
 List of national vegetation classification systems
 Phytogeography
 Plant community

References 

Botany
Ecology